1988 Winter Olympic Games cross-country skiing results was contested at the Canmore Nordic Centre in Canmore, Alberta, Canada.

Medal summary

Medal table

Participating NOCs
Thirty-four nations sent cross-country skiers to compete in the events in Calgary.

Men's events

Women's events

See also
Cross-country skiing at the 1988 Winter Paralympics

References

External links
 Official Olympic Report

 
1988 Winter Olympics
1988 Winter Olympics events
Olympics
Cross-country skiing competitions in Canada